Erald Briscoe, also known as Englishman is a British-born reggae musician who has recorded as a solo artist and has also played bass guitar in several bands, including Ras Michael's Sons of Negus, the Shango Band (with whom he also sings), and JFC.

Biography
Briscoe was born and raised in the UK, and as a teenager was a member of the London-based Revelation Reggae Band, taking initial inspiration from players such as Paul McCartney, Stanley Clarke and Robbie Shakespeare. He then joined Ras Michael's band, with which he toured Europe. In the late 1980s be began releasing records under the name Englishman, with debut album Fighting to Survive released in 1986. backed by the Roots Vibration Band, he became popular in the United States, and he has been based for most of his life in Washington, DC.

Discography
Fighting to Survive (1986), Mighty Roots
My African Sister (1986), Mighty Roots
Check For the Youth (1987), Mighty Roots
Meditations of South Africa (1987), Mighty Roots
Roots Vibration in a Combination Stylee (1987), Mighty Roots - Englishman & Maccabee
Man Machine Music (1989), Mighty Roots
Shango Charisma (1992), Ras
One Vibration (1995)
Turning Point (1995)
On Target (1996) - Englishman & Maccabee
Wisdom of Steel (1999), Black Liberty
13 Joints!!!! (2001)
Live in LA, Mighty Roots

Compilations
Check For the Best (1990), Mad Dawg

with the Shango Band
Keep It Real (2006)
Wise Shepherd (2007), Mighty Roots

References

British reggae musicians
Living people
Year of birth missing (living people)